Lena Klenke (born 25  December 1995) is a German actress. She is best known for her role as Lisa Novak in the 2019 Netflix series How to Sell Drugs Online (Fast).

Early life 
Klenke was educated at Carl-von-Ossietzky-Gymnasium and at Free University of Berlin.

Career
She started her career in 2010 in the film The Silence and has had primary roles in German films and TV series. In 2013, she made a cameo in  Fack ju Gohte. In 2019, she appeared in the Netflix comedy drama How to Sell Drugs Online (Fast). She appears in seasons 1, 2 and 3.

Selected filmography

References

External links 

1995 births
Living people
German film actresses
People from Berlin